Dictée/Liber Novus is an album by John Zorn which features two compositions: Dictée (a homage to writer and conceptual artist Theresa Hak Kyung Cha) and Liber Novus (inspired by the Red Book of Carl Jung).

Reception

Allmusic awarded the album 4 stars. All About Jazz stated "For adventurous listeners in search of new musical experience, it is an exciting experience that is vast in scope and full of delightful mysteries".

Track listing
All compositions by John Zorn
 "Dictée" - 23:18
 "Liber Novus" - 16:02

Personnel
Sylvie Courvoisier - piano, French Narration
Okkyung Lee - cello, Korean Narration
John Medeski - organ
Ned Rothenberg - Shakuhachi, bass flute, clarinet
David Slusser - sound effects
Kenny Wollesen - vibraphone, percussion, Wollesonics
John Zorn - foley effects, samples, German Narration
Stephen Gosling - piano

References

2010 albums
John Zorn albums
Albums produced by John Zorn
Tzadik Records albums